Isaura Tavares Gomes (born 1944) is a Cape Verdean pharmacist, politician and women's rights activist. Representing the African Party for the Independence of Guinea and Cape Verde, she was the first and only woman to become a deputy following Cape Verde's independence in 1975 and the country's first female mayor when she was elected mayor of São Vicente in 2004.

References

1944 births
Living people
Cape Verdean activists
Women's rights activists
Members of the National Assembly (Cape Verde)
20th-century women politicians
Presidents of municipalities in Cape Verde
University of Coimbra alumni
Women pharmacists
Cape Verdean pharmacists
Cape Verdean women in politics